South Main Historic District is a national historic district located at Bishopville, Lee County, South Carolina.  It encompasses 11 contributing buildings in a residential section of Bishopville. They were constructed between about 1880 and 1925, and is the best remaining concentration of historic residential architecture in Bishopville.  The district contains a fine grouping of late-19th and early-20th century residences reflecting the vernacular Queen Anne, Colonial Revival and Bungalow styles.

It was added to the National Register of Historic Places in 1986.

References 

Commercial buildings on the National Register of Historic Places in South Carolina
Historic districts on the National Register of Historic Places in South Carolina
Queen Anne architecture in South Carolina
Colonial Revival architecture in South Carolina
Buildings and structures in Lee County, South Carolina
National Register of Historic Places in Lee County, South Carolina